Tomasz Choczaj (born 21 May 1976 in Poznań) is a Polish former field hockey player who competed in the 2000 Summer Olympics.

References

External links

1976 births
Living people
Polish male field hockey players
Olympic field hockey players of Poland
1998 Men's Hockey World Cup players
Field hockey players at the 2000 Summer Olympics
2002 Men's Hockey World Cup players
Sportspeople from Poznań